Frafjorden is a fjord in the municipalities of Gjesdal and Sandnes in Rogaland county, Norway. The  fjord is the innermost branch of the Høgsfjorden. The Frafjorden has steep sides with no habitation along its shores, except for the village of Frafjord at the innermost part of the fjord. There are also many holiday cottages on top of the high mountain located south of the village of Frafjord. The village of Dirdal is located at the mouth of the Frafjorden.

See also
 List of Norwegian fjords

References

Fjords of Rogaland
Gjesdal
Sandnes